Castello Tesino (Castèl Tasìn or Castèlo in local dialect) is a comune (municipality) in Trentino in the northern Italian region Trentino-Alto Adige/Südtirol, located about  east of Trento.

Castello Tesino borders the following municipalities: Canal San Bovo, Pieve Tesino, Scurelle, Cinte Tesino, Lamon, Grigno, and Arsiè.

References

Cities and towns in Trentino-Alto Adige/Südtirol
Hilltowns in Trentino-Alto Adige/Südtirol